Michael Wildman is a British actor. He appeared in the film Harry Potter and the Order of the Phoenix. He played the role of aggressive, feisty centaur Magorian. Prior to accepting this role, Wildman was in the West End playing Lance Corporal Dawson in A Few Good Men alongside Rob Lowe and other programmes, most notably in Episode 5 of the British sitcom Extras alongside Samuel L. Jackson and in the part of the first Marc MacKenzie in Family Affairs. He portrayed the role of Al Chapman on the ITV soap opera Emmerdale between August 2019 and October 2022.

Screen credits

 Bring Me the Head of Mavis Davis (1997) as Hilary
 Smack the Pony Episodes No.1.7 (1999) and No.1.3 (1999)TV episode
 Happiness (2001) TV Series as Toby X
 Is Harry on the Boat? Episode No.1.6 (2002) TV Episode as Josh
 "Team Work" (1999) TV Episode as Karl Lawrence
 "A Hard Day's Night" (2003) TV Episode as Rollo
 "Dark Places" (2010) TV Episode as Troy
 Casualty
 Peep Show Episode No.1.5 (2003) TV Episode as Band Member
 Family Affairs (2003–2004) as Marc MacKenzie No.1 
 Down to Earth "Ignorance Is Bliss" (2005) TV Episode as Alex Faraday
 Extras Episode No.1.5 (2005) TV Episode as Danny
 Waking the Dead Black Run (2005) TV Episode as Tom
 The Bourne Ultimatum (2007) as CRI Agent
 W delta Z (2007) as O'Hare
 Frankenstein (2007) as DCI Connely
 Harry Potter and the Order of the Phoenix (2007) as Magorian Centaur
 HolbyBlue (2008) as Adam Starkey
 Miranda (2009) as The Gym Instructor (Series 1 Episode 3 "Job")
 Primeval (2009) as Captain Ross
 Plus One (2009) as Vic
 New Tricks (2010) as Milton Joseph
 Walter's War (2011) as Edward Tull
 Me and Mrs Jones (2012) as Nero
 Acts Of Godfrey (2012) as Jamie
 Being Human (2012) as Milo
 The Sweeney (2012) as Evelyn Simmonds
 Eve (2016) as Lord Hoffman
 Silent Witness (2016) as DI Joe Curtis
 Midsomer Murders as Killion Staples episode 18.4 "A Dying Art"
 London Has Fallen (2016) as Agent Voight 
 Death in Paradise (2017) as Archer Browne
 Back (2017–2021) as Tom
 American Assassin (2017) as Orion instructor
 Ready Player One (2018) as Sixer Drill Instructor
 Emmerdale (2019–2022) as Al Chapman
 Liar (2020) as DI Michael McCoy

References

External links
 

English male film actors
Year of birth missing (living people)
Living people
Place of birth missing (living people)
20th-century English male actors
21st-century English male actors
English male television actors
British people of Barbadian descent